Joseph Glasco (1925 – May 31, 1996) was an American Abstract Expressionist painter and sculptor.

Early life
Joseph Glasco was born in Pauls Valley, Oklahoma, but grew up in Texas. His parents were Lowell and Pauline Glasco. He had three brothers, Gregory, Gordon Michael, and two sisters, Anne Brawley and Marion Glasco (married to oilman C. Fred Chambers).

Glasco graduated from the University of Texas at Austin. Shortly after, he enlisted in the United States Army during World War II, and he served in the Battle of the Bulge. After the war, he enrolled at the Portsmouth Art School in Bristol, England. He also studied at the School of Painting and Sculpture, in San Miguel de Allende, Mexico. He subsequently attended the Art Students League of New York.

Career
Glasco became a renowned painter in New York City in the 1950s to 1970s. He was influenced by his friendships with Jackson Pollock and Alfonso A. Ossorio as well as the artwork of Jean Dubuffet and the art theory of Hans Hofmann. His works are on permanent display in numerous museums, including the Metropolitan Museum of Art, the Museum of Modern Art, the Solomon R. Guggenheim Museum, the Whitney Museum of American Art in New York City, the Hirshhorn Museum in Washington, and the Museum of Fine Arts, Houston.

Glasco endowed the Joseph Glasco Charitable Foundation.

Personal life and death
Glasco was the lover of the writer William Goyen and in Clark Davis' biography of Goyen called It Starts With Trouble (University of Texas Press, 2015), he documents their relationship. Glasco retired in Galveston, Texas in 1972, where he maintained a studio on The Strand near the Strand Emporium, and lived as a virtual recluse. Glasco died on May 31, 1996, in Galveston, Texas.

References

1925 births
1996 deaths
People from Pauls Valley, Oklahoma
People from Galveston, Texas
University of Texas at Austin alumni
United States Army personnel of World War II
20th-century American painters
American male painters
Abstract expressionist artists
LGBT people from Oklahoma
American gay artists
United States Army soldiers
20th-century American LGBT people
20th-century American male artists